Sairaj Bahutule  (born 6 January 1973, Bombay, Maharashtra, India) is a former Indian cricketer. He is an allrounder who specializes in leg spin bowling. He played domestic cricket for Mumbai and later on with Vidarbha.

Playing career 

Standout performances, including a 13-wicket match in the Irani Trophy led him to be called into the Indian team in 1997. Three years later, an injury to Anil Kumble enabled him to be called up for a Test match against Australia, but he struggled in his two Tests.

Sairaj has played in England for the last 5 summers for Surrey Championship side Reigate Priory in the Premier Division. In 2005 they won the title, with a valuable contribution with bat and ball from Sairaj.

Bahutule retired from first-class cricket on 1 January 2013.

Coaching career 
In June 2014, he was appointed the coach of the Kerala cricket team. In July 2015, he was appointed coach of the Bengal cricket team.

In February 2018, He was appointed as spin bowling coach for Rajasthan Royals.

Trivia

Sairaj Bahutule was one of the bowlers for St. Xavier's High School when Sachin Tendulkar and teammate Vinod Kambli scored an unbroken 664-run partnership for Shardashram Vidyamandir in a Lord Harris Shield inter-school game in 1988.

Sources
Sairaj Bahutule at Cricinfo

References

External links

1973 births
India One Day International cricketers
India Test cricketers
Indian cricketers
Mumbai cricketers
Maharashtra cricketers
Assam cricketers
Vidarbha cricketers
Andhra cricketers
Surrey Cricket Board cricketers
West Zone cricketers
Living people
Cricketers from Mumbai
Indian cricket coaches